Lone Kristoffersen (born 20 November 1961 in Glostrup, Denmark) is a Danish curler.

She competed at the 1988 Winter Olympics when curling was a demonstration sport. The Danish women's team finished in sixth place.

Teams

Women's

Mixed

References

External links
 

Living people
1961 births
People from Glostrup Municipality
Danish female curlers
Curlers at the 1988 Winter Olympics
Olympic curlers of Denmark
Danish curling champions
Sportspeople from the Capital Region of Denmark
20th-century Danish women